A genogram (also known as a McGoldrick–Gerson study, a Lapidus schematic or a family diagram) is a pictorial display of a person's family relationships and medical history. It goes beyond a traditional family tree by allowing the user to visualize hereditary patterns and psychological factors that punctuate relationships. It can be used to identify repetitive patterns of behavior and to recognize hereditary tendencies.

Murray Bowen invented the concept of the genogram as part of his family systems model in the 1970s. Genograms were later developed and popularized in clinical settings by Monica McGoldrick and Randy Gerson through the publication of a book titled Genograms: Assessment and Intervention in 1985. Genograms are now used by various groups of people in a variety of fields such as medicine, psychiatry, psychology, social work, genetic research, education, and many more.  Some practitioners in personal and family therapy use genograms for personal records and/or to explain family dynamics to the client.  Few if any genealogists use them. More recently there has been an increase in the recognition and use of systemic therapies and methods to augment more traditional behaviour assessment, clinical formulation and case consultation.

Symbols 
A genogram is created with simple symbols representing the gender, with various lines to illustrate family relationships. Some genogram users also put circles around members who live in the same living spaces.  Genograms can be prepared by using a complex word processor, or a computer drawing program.  There are also computer programs that are custom designed for genograms.

Genogram symbols will usually have the date of birth (and date of death if applicable) above, and the name of the individual underneath. The inside of the symbol will hold the person's current age or various codes for genetic diseases or user-defined properties:  abortions, still-births, SIDS, cohabitations, etc.

Content 
A genogram can contain a wealth of information on the families represented. It will not only show the names of people who belong to a family lineage, but how these relatives relate to each other. For example, a genogram will not only show that a person called Paul and his wife Lily have three children, but that their eldest child was sent to boarding school; that their middle child is always in conflict with her mother; that their youngest has juvenile diabetes; that Paul suffered from depression, was an alcoholic, and a philosopher; and that Lily has not spoken to her brother for years, has breast cancer, and has a history of quitting her jobs.

Family relationships 
One of the advantages of a genogram is the ability to use colour-coded lines to define different types of relationships such as family relationships, emotional relationships and social relationships. Within family relationships, you can illustrate if a couple is married, divorced, common-law, engaged, etc.

Emotional relationships 
Genograms may also include emotional relationships. These provide an in-depth analysis of how individuals relate to one another. Colour-coded lines represent various emotional relationships that bond individuals together.

Social relationships 
Another component of genograms is social relationships. These allow users to link individuals who are not related to one another, but who have a connection in society-at-large, such as neighbor, co-worker, boss-employee, pastor-church member, teacher-student, etc. Social relationships can also illustrate an individual's relation to a social entity. The use of social relationships links allows the genogram to be used in a business environment to create organizational charts or floor plan layouts of the employees.

A genogram looks like a family tree, but with all the different types of relationships, it contains a significantly more detailed and complete picture of the family or group it illustrates.

Purpose

Genealogy 
In genealogy, genograms are used to record family history through the lives of each of its members. Genograms allow the genealogist to graphically portray complex family trees that show marriages and divorces, reconstituted families, adoptions, strained relationships, family cohesion, etc. Genealogists can use genograms to discover and analyze interesting facts about their family history, such as a naming pattern, sibling rivalry, or significant events like immigration.

Medicine 
In medicine, medical genograms provide a quick and useful context in which to evaluate an individual's health risks. Knowledge of diseases and conditions that occur within a family can give a health care team invaluable information that may aid in a swift, accurate diagnosis and treatment of health problems.  And, a knowledge of diseases and illnesses that "run" in families can give individuals an important head start in pursuing effective preventive measures. A medical genogram is helpful in determining patterns of disease or illness within a family.  Medical genograms can include many generations, however four generations may prove to be enough detail.

Sociology 
Genograms are used by sociologists to gather objective and consistent information from the clients and their family, helping them to view the client's issues in the larger context of their marital relationship, family relationships and culture of origin and underlining key issues to discuss in client counseling. Genograms portray emotional relationships, which allow Sociologists to see and evaluate possible conflicts within the family. Psychological patterns may be detected in the genogram which provide the basis for precautionary and preventive measures that otherwise might not be warranted.

Social work 
In social work, genograms are used to display emotional bonds between individuals composing a family or social unit. A genogram will help social workers to make an assessment of the level of cohesiveness within a family or a group and to evaluate if proper care is available within that unit. Genograms also allow displaying social relationships that illustrate the places people attend such as schools, churches, youth facilities, associations or retirement homes.

Family therapy 
In family therapy, genograms are used to study and record relationship patterns between family members and the individual characteristics that make up these patterns that occur. A genogram will help family therapists to make an appropriate assessment of the relationship patterns and where intervention may be needed to help the family reduce the dysfunction and/or problematic situation that brought them into therapy.

Research 
In research, genograms allow researchers to understand multi generational processes within various plant and animal species, such as the development of mutations. Genograms can also illustrate rates of renewal, mechanisms of survival, or processes involved in the regulation of tolerance, among other things.

Education 
In education, genograms can be used by teachers and students for illustrating book reviews, or family trees of a famous politician, philosopher, scientist, musician, etc. They allow them to focus their attention on specific details and also see the big picture of the books and individuals they are studying.

Psychology 
In recent years there has been an increasing recognition of the critical role of relationships, including family relationships as well as those between clients and carers in the maintenance and amelioration of challenging behaviour, as well as in attempts to integrate the fields of family therapy and applied behaviour analysis  using such methods as Systemic Hypothesising or Systemic consultation. These approaches use system models such as genogram, sociogram and to a lesser extent systograms to help study and record relationship patterns (within the family and external systems such as schools and other care providers) and the individual characteristics that may be contributing to repetitive and challenging patterns of behavior.

Creating genograms 
Genograms can be useful in almost any profession that deals with social interaction. Genograms can help to visualize complex interactions between individuals and to study patterns of behaviors or diseases. Genograms are easily created with genealogy software, as advanced software allows the user to include tremendous amounts of data. Genealogy software also allows the user to create detailed reports containing analysis of the information stored in each person's individual properties.  Commercial software, such as Genopro, Genome Analytics and iGenogram for iPad is available to produce genograms, as well as hundreds of different academic and scientific programs for specialized uses. Genograms are often drawn by hand, sketched working right with the client.  It is also possible to create a Genogram in any graphics or word processing program.

See also 
Ahnentafel
Cousin chart (Table of consanguinity)
Eco-map
Genetic genealogy#Genetic similarity among relatives (for general genetic similarity)
Genealogical numbering systems
Pedigree chart

References

External links 
Introduction to genograms
 Genogram Analytics, software for genograms and ecomaps
 Useful PDF including medical geneogram example

Charts
Psychological tests and scales
Family therapy